Gabriel Adrien Robinet de Cléry (18 August 1836 - 1914) was a French magistrate, historian and legal writer active during the Second French Empire and the Third French Republic. He was a convinced Legitimist. He was born in Metz and died in Anhée (Belgium).

1836 births
1914 deaths
Lawyers from Metz
20th-century French historians
French magistrates
19th-century French historians